Blanca Elaine Reyes (born February 10, 1986), who goes by the mononym Blanca, is a Puerto Rican-born American Contemporary Christian music singer-songwriter. Until 2013, she was a member of Group 1 Crew. She is now a solo artist. She released her debut EP on January 13, 2015, Who I Am EP, with Word Records and her first studio album, Blanca, on May 4, 2015.

Early life
Blanca was born Blanca Elaine Reyes, in Puerto Rico on February 10, 1986.

Her father was into drugs and alcohol until he had an encounter with Jesus, which caused him to start leading his family in the ways of Christ.

Music career
Blanca was a member of Group 1 Crew from its inception until 2013, when she began her solo career. She collaborated with the group Building 429 for the song "Press On" which charted at position 7 on the Billboard Christian Songs chart, and stayed on the chart for 26 weeks. She also collaborated on songs in Spanish, such as the introduction of the album Más by Redimi2 and Funky.

Blanca's debut album titled Blanca was released on May 4, 2015, on Word Records. Her first solo single, "Who I Am", ranked number one on the  Billboard Christian Airplay chart and number 27 on the annual chart. Her second release as a solo artist, Who I Am EP, was released on January 13, 2015, also via Word Records, and was placed on Billboard Hot 100 and Hot Christian Songs charts.

Blanca's solo career continued with the release of the album Shattered in 2018, which was subsequently re-released entirely in Spanish as Quebrantado, featuring Redimi2 and Tye Tribbett, again entering the Billboard Christian Airplay chart. In 2019, she was part of the main cast of the Bogotá Gospel event, sharing the stage with artists such as Alex Zurdo, Danilo Montero, and others, in addition to being awarded at the Tecla awards as Best Musician Creating Content on Social Networks.

Cultivating her Latin roots, in 2020 she announced her second EP in Spanish titled Renovada, handling singles mostly in Spanish and collaborations with Christine D'Clario, Gawvi, "Papi Song" with Genio, in honor of her father Toñito Reyes, who was a Christian salsero in Puerto Rico, and others.

Personal life
On January 21, 2013, Blanca announced that she and her husband, Ben Callahan of Group 1 Crew, were expecting their first child. She had a son, named London, in July 2013. On December 1, 2020, Blanca announced that she and her husband had divorced, after two years of separation.

Discography

Studio albums

EPs

Singles

Album appearances

Notes

References

External links 
 

Living people
American performers of Christian music
Converts to Christianity
Puerto Rican Christians
21st-century Puerto Rican women singers
Singers from Florida
People from Orlando, Florida
Songwriters from Florida
1986 births
Word Records artists